Mundaka Kanni Amman Temple is a Hindu temple in the neighbourhood of Mylapore in Chennai, India. It is dedicated to Mariamman and used to be famous for animal sacrifices. The temple is one of the most famous shrines dedicated to Mariamman. 

The neighbourhood is served by Mundakanniamman Koil railway station of the Chennai MRTS on the Chennai Beach - Velachery line.

Location
In the Luz-Sanlthome road, at the left an arch could be seen. Through that route this temple could be reached.

Structure
In the rear side of the presiding deity a tree is found. It is worshipped as the Temple tree.  Facing east, this temple has a three-tier gopura. Sacred Ficus religiosa trees are found inside the temple. Vinayaka and Nāgas are also found inside.

Presiding deity
Mundakanniamman is the presiding deity of the temple. She is one of the Avatars of Renukadevi and one among the Saptakannis.

References

External links
 அருள்மிகு முண்டகக்கண்ணி அம்மன் கோயில் மற்றும் திருவள்ளுவர் திருக்கோயில், மயிலாப்பூர், சென்னை, திருக்கோயில் தளம்
 மயிலை முண்டகக்கண்ணி அம்மன் கோயில் கூழின் மகிமைகள்.... சக்தி ஆன்லைன், 19 சூலை 2019
 

Hindu temples in Chennai